Wamp'una (Quechua wamp'u boat, -na a suffix, also spelled Huampuna) is a mountain in the Cordillera Central in the Andes of Peru, about  high. It contains one of the highest surveyed caves in the word, Qaqa Mach'ay. Wamp'una is located in the Lima Region, Yauyos Province, on the border of the districts of Huantán and Laraos. It lies southwest of  T'uruyuq, southeast of the lake named Pumaqucha. It is situated on the southern border of the Nor Yauyos-Cochas Landscape Reserve.

See also 
 Pumaqucha
 Sima Pumaqucha

References

Mountains of Peru
Mountains of Lima Region